Bothrops jararaca — known as the jararaca or yarara — is a highly venomous pit viper species endemic to South America in southern Brazil, Paraguay, and northern Argentina. Within its geographic range, it is often abundant and is an important cause of snakebite. No subspecies are currently recognized.

The drugs known as angiotensin converting enzyme (ACE) inhibitors, used for the treatment of hypertension and some types of congestive heart failure, were developed from a peptide found in the venom of this species.

Description
This is a slender and terrestrial species that grows to a maximum total length of 160 cm (63 in), although the average total length is much less.

The head scalation includes 5-12 intersupraoculars that are weakly keeled, 7-9 supralabials (usually 8) of which the second is fused with the prelacunal to form a lacunolabial, and 9-13 sublabials (usually 10-12). Midbody, there are 20-27 rows of dorsal scales (usually 23-25). The ventrals number 170-216 (rarely 218) and the 51-71 subcaudals are mostly paired.

The color pattern is extremely variable, consisting of a dorsal ground color that may be tan, brown, gray, yellow, olive, or almost maroon. Midbody, this color is usually somewhat lighter than the head, anterior and posterior. The dorsal ground color is overlaid with a series of pale-edged, dark brown subtriangular or trapezoidal markings on either side of the body, the apices of which reach the vertebral line. These marking may be situated opposite each other, or partially or completely juxtaposed; most specimens have a pattern with all three variations. In juveniles, the tip of the tail is white.

The head has a prominent dark brown stripe that runs from behind the eye, on either side of the head, back to the angle of the mouth, usually touching the last three supralabials. Dorsally, this stripe is bordered by a distinct pale area. The tongue is black, and the iris is gold to greenish gold with slightly darker reticulations.

Behavior 
This snake usually hunts at night, and during the day takes shelter in foliage;  In habitats at higher altitudes, and those with colder months there is a significant reduction in activities, with greater activity observed during the warmer months. They are ambush predators and equipped with good camouflage, juveniles use caudal luring to attract prey, making movements with the tip of the tail whose coloring is white, the tip of the juvenile's tail is very similar to an insect larva, and is used to attract and capture prey.

Common names
The English common name is jararaca. In Paraguay and Uruguay, it is also called .

Geographic range
This snake is found in southern Brazil, northeastern Paraguay and northern Argentina (Misiones). The type locality is listed as "Lagoa d'Arara am Mucurí" (Brazil) by Wied-Neuwied in 1825. It occurs from near sea level to over 1,000 m altitude.

Habitat
This species mainly inhabits dense tropical perennial forests on the Atlantic coast, about 1000 m above sea level. They also live in thickets, savannas, semitropical highland forests, as well as in cultivated fields.  Adults are mainly terrestrial, but juveniles are also arboreal.

Feeding
The eating habits of this species are generalist, with an ontogenetic change in the feeding on ectothermic prey.  Juveniles feed 75% on frogs and arthropods, while adults feed on mammals with 80% of the diet of adult snakes being rodents.

Reproduction
Mating takes place between April and May, males mate with more than one female, and there are also fights between males for the female. Females demonstrate secondary vitalogenesis, while ovulation and fertilization occurs in the spring (October to December or January), while the female gives birth in February to April, on average, producing 10-14 offspring per season, both sexes are believed to reach sexual maturity at 2 years of age.

Venom

Potency
This species is often abundant within its range of southeastern Brazil, where it was responsible for 52% (3,446 cases) of snakebites between 1902 and 1945, with a 0.7% fatality rate.

The venom is quite toxic. In mice, the median lethal dose is 1.2-1.3 mg/kg intravenous, 1.4 mg/kg intraperitoneal and 3.0 mg/kg subcutaneous. The lethal dose for a 60 kg adult human is 70 mg.

Effects
Typical envenomation symptoms include local swelling, petechiae, bruising and blistering of the affected limb, spontaneous systemic bleeding of the gums and into the skin, subconjunctival hemorrhage and incoagulable blood. The systemic symptoms can potentially be fatal and may involve hemostatic disorders, intracranial hemorrhage, shock, and kidney failure.

Thrombotic microangiopathy has also been reported, a 56-y-old woman was transferred from a primary hospital seven hours after being bitten by a Bothrops Jararaca in the distal left leg. She developed extending edema to the proximal thigh, associated with intense radiating local pain, local paresthesia and ecchymosis. Laboratory features upon adimission revealed coagulopathy, thrombocytopenia, and slight increase in serum creatinine. The patient was treated with Bothropic antivenom and fluids replacement. During evolution, her thrombocytopenia and anemia worsened, with blood films showing fragmented red cells, haptoglobin consumption, increase in lactate dehydrogenase and progressive increase in serum creatinine. Despite the severity, the outcome following conservative treatment was good, with complete recovery.

Medical uses
The drugs known as angiotensin converting enzyme inhibitors (ACE inhibitors), which are used for the treatment of hypertension and some types of congestive heart failure, were developed from a peptide found in the venom of this species in 1965 by Brazilian scientist Sérgio Henrique Ferreira.

Haemocoagulase enzyme derived from the venom is used as antihemorrhagic drug.

References

Further reading

External links

jararaca
Snakes of South America
Reptiles of Argentina
Reptiles of Brazil
Reptiles of Paraguay
Fauna of the Pantanal
Reptiles described in 1824